NGC 52 (PGC 978) is an edge-on spiral galaxy in the constellation Pegasus. It was discovered on September 18, 1784 by William Herschel. He described it as "very faint, small, extended."

Physical Characteristics
The galaxy is approximately 150,000 light years across. This makes it, in comparison, about 1.5 times as large as the Milky Way. The galaxy also has a satellite elliptical galaxy called PGC (Principal Galaxies Catalogue) 1563523.

See also 
 Spiral galaxy 
 List of NGC objects (1–1000)
 Pegasus (constellation)

References

External links 
 
 
 SEDS

0052
00978
Unbarred spiral galaxies
IRAS catalogue objects
17840918
00140
Discoveries by William Herschel
Pegasus (constellation)